The Maroa Caldera (Maroa Volcanic Centre) is approximately  in size and is located in the north-east corner of the earlier Whakamaru caldera in the Taupo Volcanic Zone in the North Island of New Zealand.

Geography
Its northern rim is to the south of the Waikato River at Atiamuri. At Atiamuri the Ohakuri Caldera which had a paired eruption with the Rotorua Caldera is to its immediate north. The eastern boundary is also defined by the present Waikato River and it extends as far south as probably opposite Orakei Korako on the river.

Eruptive history
The Maroa Caldera's last major eruption produced  of tephra about 230,000 years ago (230 ka). Its earliest eruption was about 300 ka with decreasing frequency and volume to as recently as 16.5ka when an eruption of about  occurred from the Puketarata volcanic complex ( to distinguish from another older volcano of this name near Te Kawa). The caldera is now mainly dome lava in filled.
In summary going back in time: 
 229,000 to 196,000 Pukeahua deposits and dome building
 220,000 unclear where Mokai ignimbrite that outcrop in some of Maroa area comes from
 229,000 ± 12,000 Atiamuri deposits from northern Maroa
 251,000 ± 17,000 onward two large parallel dome complexes developed
 256,000 ± 12,000 Orakonui pyroclastics from a central Maroa source
 272,000 ± 10,000 Putauaki pyroclastics from a central Maroa source
 275,000 to 240,000 years ago small-scale pyroclastic eruptions
 283,000 ± 11,000 Korotai deposits from northern Maroa
 305,000 ± 17,000 oldest Maroa dome

References 

Rift volcanoes
Whakamaru caldera complex
Taupō Volcanic Zone
VEI-7 volcanoes
Pleistocene calderas
Calderas of New Zealand
Volcanoes of Waikato